Martha Ellen Thomas (born 31 May 1996) is a professional footballer who plays as a striker for Manchester United in the Women's Super League.

Thomas played four years of college soccer for Charlotte 49ers before playing professionally with French Division 2 Féminine club Le Havre and West Ham United of the English Women's Super League, moving to Manchester United in 2021. Born in England and raised mainly in the United States, she represents Scotland at international level.

Early life
Thomas was born in Malmesbury, Wiltshire, to a Scottish mother, Christine, and English father, Andrew. She grew up in Dorchester until 2001 when the family moved to Atlanta, when her father got a job in the United States. They briefly returned to Dorchester in 2003 where Thomas played for Dorchester Town for a season before once again relocating to the States, this time to Weston, Florida, at the age of six. While in Weston, she played for youth club Weston FC.

Charlotte 49ers
Thomas played college soccer for Charlotte 49ers, captaining the team for two seasons. In her first year, Thomas led the team in goals with 11 and was voted Conference USA Freshman of the Year. The following three years, Thomas was selected to the All-Conference USA First Team as well as being voted as the league's Offensive Player of the Year in 2016 and 2017. Upon leaving, Thomas ranked as the school's all-time leading goalscorer with 47. She was also named team MVP in each of her four seasons.

Club career

Le Havre
Thomas had hoped to enter the 2018 NWSL College Draft in January 2018, but suffered an ACL injury in her final appearance for the 49ers in November 2017. Having rehabbed, Thomas belatedly began her professional career with Le Havre AC in the French Division 2, signing for the club in August 2018. She made her debut on 21 October 2018, starting in a 1–0 defeat to Stade de Reims. She scored 6 goals in 13 league appearances as Le Havre finished second.

West Ham United
On 16 July 2019, Thomas signed for West Ham United of the FA WSL, taking the number 9 shirt following the departure of Jane Ross. Thomas started and scored on her debut, the season opener as West Ham lost 2–1 away to reigning champions Arsenal on 8 September 2019. She scored her first career hat-trick during the first half of a 5–0 win against Reading on 3 April 2021. On 21 May 2021, it was confirmed Thomas would leave West Ham after two seasons following the expiration of her contract.

Manchester United
On 28 July 2021, Thomas signed for Manchester United on a two-year deal with the option of an additional year.

International career
Thomas represented the United States at youth level, playing for the under-23 team in 2019 at the Portland Thorns Spring Invitational preseason tournament. She had not yet acquired American citizenship, however, making her ineligible to represent the senior team.

Thomas was eligible to represent both England and Scotland at the senior level. In September 2019 she attended a training camp with the Scotland national team. She subsequently received her first call-up to the Scotland squad on 25 October 2019 but was forced to withdraw through injury. She was again selected by Scotland for the 2020 Pinatar Cup and scored two goals as she made her international debut in a 3–0 win against Ukraine on 4 March 2020. Thomas scored another brace in her seventh appearance for Scotland on 19 February 2021 during a 10–0 victory over Cyprus as part of UEFA Euro 2022 qualifying, the first time Scotland had hit double figures since 2015. Despite the emphatic victory, Scotland had already been mathematically eliminated from qualification in December 2020.

Personal life
Thomas' great uncle, Jim Kirkland, also played football professionally for Aberdeen in the Scottish top-flight.

She is in a relationship with fellow footballer Ellie Leek. The two met while both playing for Le Havre. She has been a vocal supporter of Stonewall's Rainbow Laces campaign.

Career statistics

Club

International
Statistics accurate as of match played 21 February 2023.

International goals

Scores and results list Scotland's goal tally first, score column indicates score after each Thomas goal.

Honours

College
Charlotte 49ers
 Conference USA Women's Soccer Tournament: 2016

Individual 
 Conference USA Offensive Player of the Year: 2016, 2017

References

External links
 
 
 
 Martha Thomas at Charlotte 49ers

1996 births
Living people
Sportspeople from Malmesbury
Footballers from Wiltshire
Scottish women's footballers
Scotland women's international footballers
English women's footballers
English people of Scottish descent
Charlotte 49ers women's soccer players
West Ham United F.C. Women players
Manchester United W.F.C. players
Women's Super League players
Women's association football forwards
Scottish expatriate women's footballers
English expatriate footballers
Scottish expatriate sportspeople in the United States
English expatriate sportspeople in the United States
English expatriate sportspeople in France
Expatriate women's footballers in France
Lesbian sportswomen
English LGBT sportspeople